Rote Spitze is the name of:

 Rote Spitze (Villgraten Mountains), a peak in the Villgraten Mountains of East Tyrol, Austria
 Rote Spitze (Allgäu Alps), a peak in the Allgäu Alps in North Tyrol, Austria

See also
 Rote Spitzen, the twin towers and symbol of the former residence town of Altenburg in Thuringia, Germany.